Chetton is a civil parish in Shropshire, England.  It contains 13 listed buildings that are recorded in the National Heritage List for England.  Of these, two are listed at Grade II*, the middle of the three grades, and the others are at Grade II, the lowest grade.  Apart from the small village of Chetton, the parish is entirely rural.  Other than a church, all the listed buildings are houses, farmhouses, and farm buildings.


Key

Buildings

References

Citations

Sources

Lists of buildings and structures in Shropshire